South Auckland is an imprecisely defined urban area of Auckland, New Zealand, with a young population, a relatively large Polynesian and Māori demographic, and lower incomes than other parts of Auckland. The name South Auckland, though not an official place name, has come into common use
among New Zealanders. It also appears in the names of some organisations and companies.

Since the 1970s the term "South Auckland" has developed negative connotations with outsiders, being associated with deprivation, crime and violence. When street crime occurs in the area, the mass media tend to use the generic "South Auckland" phrase, with its vague and unfortunate stereotypes, rather than a more precise name of a suburb or territorial authority. Barry Curtis, mayor of Manukau City from 1983 to 2007, tried to discourage use of the name "South Auckland" because of its negative connotations.

History 

The area between Manurewa and Clevedon was historically a large swampland. By the 1890s, this swampland was a major location for kauri gum digging, and became known variously as the Ardmore Gumfield or the Papakura Gumfield. By the 1900s, Auckland gumfields and swamps began being converted into farmland and orchards.

Geography
The heart of South Auckland is the low socio-economic suburbs of the former Manukau City, typified by Ōtara but including Papatoetoe, Māngere and Manurewa. Broadly speaking, South Auckland is the urban area stretching from at the very least the narrowing of the Auckland isthmus at Ōtāhuhu, southwards through the Manukau City suburbs lying to the west and near east of Auckland's Southern Motorway (State Highway 1). The area does not include the more affluent eastern and northern Manukau City suburbs such as Howick, Dannemora, Botany Downs, Flat Bush and Pakuranga or the large rural area of Manukau City. The name does not include Franklin District, which lies south of Papakura.

Prior to the 1970s, South Auckland encompassed the region from Ōtāhuhu south to Mercer, and from the west coast to the Firth of Thames, including the southern towns of Pukekohe, Tuakau and Waiuku.

Auckland Airport is located in South Auckland, as well as several other places of interest, including the amusement park Rainbow's End, the Auckland Botanic Gardens and one of the oldest shopping malls in the country, now called Westfield Manukau City.

Some of the suburbs in South Auckland contain predominantly state housing and are the poorest suburbs of Auckland. The area also contains the industrial heartland of Auckland (Māngere, Ōtāhuhu, Manukau CBD, and the Port of Onehunga), with workshops, factories and warehouses providing work for many Aucklanders.

Politics and governance

Local government
South Auckland was formerly a part of Manukau City, which was amalgamated into the new Auckland Council in 2010, being roughly covered by the extreme southernmost portion of the Maungakiekie-Tamaki Local Board, as well as the entirety of the Māngere-Ōtāhuhu, Ōtara-Papatoetoe and Manurewa Local Boards. On the Auckland Council Governing Body, South Auckland is represented by Alf Filipaina and Lotu Fuli (Manukau Ward); and Daniel Newman and Angela Dalton (Manurewa-Papakura Ward)

National government
South Auckland has traditionally strongly supported the Labour Party in national elections. The general electorates of Māngere, Panmure-Ōtāhuhu, Manurewa, and Takanini and the Māori electorate of Tāmaki Makaurau cover the area commonly referred to as South Auckland. All are currently represented by a Labour MP in the New Zealand Parliament, and the strong support for this party was underlined by these electorates recording strong party vote majorities for Labour in the 2014 election, despite Labour's support falling to a record low nationally.

Candidates from the National, Green, New Zealand First and a range of minor parties also stand in the general electorates of South Auckland, though none has been won by a party other than Labour since 1975. The Māori electorate of Tāmaki Makaurau was held by the Māori Party co-leader Pita Sharples from 2005 until 2014.

Demographics and culture
The area has a multiracial population including Pākehā (European New Zealanders) and Asians as well as a high proportion of Polynesians and Māori. This gives it a very cosmopolitan feel and a thriving culture, especially at street level, most often seen by visitors at the Saturday markets at Ōtara, Manurewa and Māngere.

Manukau City, before its amalgamation, used the slogan "Face of the Future" to reflect its youthful demographic, having one of the highest proportion of people under 18. South Auckland is also a major centre of hip hop culture and music in New Zealand.

Notable people
People who hail from South Auckland include Olympic champion John Walker, mountaineer Edmund Hillary, and former Prime Minister David Lange. Many successful sportspeople are South Aucklanders; including rugby players Jonah Lomu and Eric Rush, rugby league player Ruben Wiki, heavyweight boxers David Tua and Joseph Parker, cricketer Daryl Tuffey, kickboxer Mark Hunt, IndyCar racer Scott Dixon, Shot-putter Valerie Adams and hip hop music artists Young Sid, Savage, and P-Money.

References

Auckland
Māori culture in Auckland
Polynesian-New Zealand culture in Auckland
Geography of Auckland